KDZA-TV was a television station broadcasting on channel 3 in Pueblo, Colorado, which broadcast from March 16, 1953, to May 7, 1954. It was the first television station established in Pueblo. The station shut down due to financial difficulties, competition from a second station in Pueblo and two outlets in Colorado Springs, and network affiliation changes in Denver that affected its main programming source.

History

KDZA-TV began telecasting March 16, 1953. It was owned by Dee B. Collins alongside independent AM outlet KDZA (1230 AM). Much of its programming, including network fare, was fed to it by a  microwave relay between Pueblo and KFEL-TV (channel 2) at Denver.

Gene O'Fallon, who owned KFEL-TV, filed to buy KDZA radio and television from Collins for $350,000, including the assumption of $100,000 in payments to DuMont Laboratories for the channel 3 transmitter, at the end of July. Four months later, O'Fallon dropped the deal, though KDZA-TV continued taking programs from KFEL-TV, including live basketball games. The move came as KFEL-TV lost both of its major network affiliations in the final quarter of 1953 to new Denver outlets KLZ-TV (CBS) and KOA-TV (NBC) and after a second Pueblo television station, KCSJ-TV (channel 5), began broadcasting as an NBC affiliate.

Ultimately, continued operation and program feeds from Denver proved uneconomical to continue. On May 7, 1954, channel 3 went silent to repair its equipment, but by then it was an open secret that the station was in financial woes. It never returned, opting not to ask the Federal Communications Commission for continued authority to remain silent. KDZA-TV was the third VHF station to close completely for economic reasons, after KFXD-TV in Nampa, Idaho, and KFOR-TV in Lincoln, Nebraska, which had shut down in August 1953 and March 1954, respectively.

The channel 3 allocation was moved to Alamosa in 1955 at the petition of KCSJ-TV, which intended to build a satellite station there. No full-power station ever appeared on the channel, but a translator of KRDO-TV was authorized to use it in December 1965. The full-power allocation was shifted from Alamosa to Glenwood Springs in January 1980 upon the petition of Western Slope Communications, which built and signed on KCWS there in 1984.

References

DZA-TV
1953 establishments in Colorado
Television channels and stations established in 1953
1954 disestablishments in Colorado
Television channels and stations disestablished in 1954
Defunct television stations in the United States
DZA-TV